Abderrahim Berrada (1938 – 20 February 2022) was a Moroccan lawyer and human rights activist.

Biography
Berrada became a lawyer in 1962, specializing in political processing. He defended activists within the National Union of Popular Forces and other political activists during the 1970s. He also represented Abraham Serfaty and Prince Moulay Hicham of Morocco. 

He was a member of the  before moving to Casablanca in 1966. During the reign of Hassan II of Morocco, Abderrahim Bouabid suggested that he serve as Minister of Justice, but he refused. He was notably a close friend of Omar Benjelloun and Mehdi Ben Barka.

Berrada died in Casablanca on 20 February 2022.

Publications
Plaidoirie pour un Maroc laïque (2019)

References

1938 births
2022 deaths
Moroccan human rights activists
20th-century Moroccan lawyers
21st-century Moroccan lawyers
People from Casablanca